Haydn George Davies (23 April 1912 – 4 September 1993) was a Welsh-born cricketer for Glamorgan County Cricket Club.

Davies is regarded as being one of the best wicketkeepers to have played for Glamorgan, taking 789 dismissals from his 423 first class games between 1935 and 1958. With 82 victims in 1955, he set a new record for the county. He took eight dismissals in a match against the South African touring team in 1955.

He was selected for a Test trial in 1946, but was kept out of the English side by Godfrey Evans.

References

External links
 
 Haydn Davies at CricketArchive

1912 births
1993 deaths
Cricketers from Llanelli
Glamorgan cricketers
Marylebone Cricket Club cricketers
Welsh cricketers
Wicket-keepers